Almurta is a small town in Victoria, Australia. It is located along Glen Alvie Road, in the Bass Coast Shire, 107 kilometres south east of Melbourne. A full post office opened here on 21 April 1914   but was closed in 1969.

References

Towns in Victoria (Australia)
Bass Coast Shire